Ruçi or Ruci is an Albanian surname, which may be a locational surname for a person from a village near Tirana named Ruç or Ruçi. The surname may refer to:

Alessio Ruci (born 1996), Albanian football player
Aristidh Ruci (1875–1950), Albanian politician
Gramoz Ruçi (born 1951), Albanian politician
Shkëlzen Ruçi (born 1992), Albanian football player
Vasil Ruci (born 1958), Albanian football player and coach

Albanian-language surnames